Planispira deaniana is a species of discoid air-breathing land snail, a gastropod mollusk in the family Camaenidae.

Morphology 
The shell of this species is oblate, with red outer lip and light brown periostracum. Some individuals have 1~2 black or brown annular bands.

Distribution 
Western and Gulf Province, Papua New Guinea.

References 

Camaenidae